William Edward Thomas (7 April 1869 – 11 July 1924) was an Australian politician.

He was born in Portland to stonemason William Thomas and Grace Bossence. He worked with his father before becoming an engine driver at the Broken Hill mines. On 12 September 1890 he married Eliza Tassicker, with whom he had four children. He returned to Portland around 1906, and became a farmer at Heywood. In 1920 he was elected to the Victorian Legislative Assembly as the Labor member for Glenelg. He was re-elected in 1924 but died in Heywood later that year; the by-election to replace him was won by his son-in-law, Ernie Bond.

References

1869 births
1924 deaths
Australian Labor Party members of the Parliament of Victoria
Members of the Victorian Legislative Assembly